Bob Dunlop (24 May 1945 – March 2000) was an Australian professional boxer who competed from 1963 to 1969. He held the Australian heavyweight title and Commonwealth light heavyweight title, and was a challenger for the Australian light heavyweight title against Clive Stewart. His professional fighting weight varied from super middleweight to heavyweight. He was inducted into the Australian National Boxing Hall of Fame in 2006.

Professional boxing record

References

External links

Image - Bob Dunlop

Family- daughter with first wife Teresa lane, kids Tamara and Wayde, Tamara born 1973 has three children with Alsteir brown-Sophie,Cameron and Gemma  

1945 births
2000 deaths
Cruiserweight boxers
Date of death missing
Heavyweight boxers
Light-heavyweight boxers
Boxers from Melbourne
Place of death missing
Sportspeople from Newcastle, New South Wales
Super-middleweight boxers
Australian male boxers
Commonwealth Boxing Council champions